Larry Eugene Temple (born December 26, 1935) is an American attorney who served as the White House Counsel to President Lyndon B. Johnson from 1967 to 1969. From 1963 to 1967, he was the Executive Assistant to Texas Governor John Connally.

In 1957, Temple graduated with a Bachelor of Business Administration degree from the University of Texas. In 1959, he earned a LL.B. degree from the University of Texas School of Law, and graduated Order of the Coif. From 1959 to 1960, he was a law clerk to U.S. Supreme Court Justice Tom C. Clark.

Currently, Temple is chairman of the board of trustees of the LBJ Foundation. Together with his wife Louann Atkins Temple, and members of his family, he works closely with University of Texas students who have been awarded the Larry Temple Scholarship, an award endowed by The University of Texas System Board of Regents in 1990.

See also 
 List of law clerks of the Supreme Court of the United States (Seat 10)

References

External links

1935 births
Living people
McCombs School of Business alumni
University of Texas School of Law alumni
White House Counsels
Texas Democrats
20th-century American lawyers
Law clerks of the Supreme Court of the United States
People from Plainview, Texas
People from Austin, Texas